Moustafa Soheim (20 March 1937 – 1 March 2008) was an Egyptian foil fencer. He competed at the 1960, 1964 and 1968 Summer Olympics. At the 1960 Games, he represented the United Arab Republic.

References

External links
 

1937 births
2008 deaths
Egyptian male foil fencers
Olympic fencers of Egypt
Fencers at the 1960 Summer Olympics
Fencers at the 1964 Summer Olympics
Fencers at the 1968 Summer Olympics
Sportspeople from Cairo